The New Water Mountains is a mountain range in southwestern Arizona. The range is on the northern border of the Kofa National Wildlife Refuge as well as the northern Kofa Mountains.

The southeast third of the range is in the Kofa Refuge, and the mountain range merges northwesterly into the Plomosa Mountains of southern La Paz County. The central part of the range is the New Water Mountains Wilderness with a lengthy east–west border on the northern Kofa National Wildlife Refuge of about 12 miles.

Three northerly routes access the mountain range; the central route accesses the Ramsey Mine and eventually the central dry wash on the north; other mines, such as the Republic Mine, are in these mountains, as well as some springs (Dripping Spring); also Brintley Well on a fourth westerly access route. The closest community to the north side of the mountain range is Brenda, Arizona east of Quartzsite.

See also 
 List of mountain ranges of La Paz County, Arizona
 List of mountain ranges of Arizona
 List of LCRV Wilderness Areas (Colorado River)

External links
New Water Mountains Wilderness

Mountain ranges of the Sonoran Desert
Mountain ranges of the Lower Colorado River Valley
Mountain ranges of La Paz County, Arizona
Mountain ranges of Arizona